Sunny 16 is the second of a three-EP series by Ben Folds. The EP includes one cover track, "Songs Of Love" (written and performed originally by Neil Hannon's The Divine Comedy on the 1996 album Casanova). The song "Rock Star" was co-written by his wife at that time, Frally Hynes-Folds.

Hidden tracks
The last two tracks both contain hidden tracks of sorts, although they are really just a snippet of one of the track layers of the song on which the tracks are hidden. In "Rock Star", it is the song's closing vocal overlays, and in "Songs of Love" is the string quartet's part.

Comments from Ben Folds
Regarding the contents of the EP, Folds said the following: "If I was starting over again and had to make a demo tape, I'd use this EP. It represents a big part of what I do very naturally. Part of me thinks I'm an idiot for 'wasting' this recording on a limited release EP, but I'm really into this method of recording and releasing quickly and making it all about music, so here it is."

Track listing

References

General references
^ Suddath, Clair, "Ben Folds Is Not Cooler Than You," pg 41, Nashville Scene, November 2, 2006.

2003 EPs
Ben Folds EPs